The Giant Arc is a large-scale structure  discovered in June 2021 that spans 3.3 billion light years. The structure of galaxies exceeds the 1.2 billion light year threshold, challenging the cosmological principle that at large enough scales the universe is considered to be the same in every place (homogeneous) and in every direction (isotropic). The Giant Arc consists of galaxies, galactic clusters, as well as gas and dust. It is located 9.2 billion light-years away and stretches across roughly a 15th of the radius of the observable universe. It was discovered using data from the Sloan Digital Sky Survey by the team of Alexia M. Lopez, a doctoral candidate in cosmology at the University of Central Lancashire.  

If the Giant Arc were visible in the night sky it would form an arc occupying as much space as 20 full moons, or 10 degrees on the sky.

See also
 Huge-LQG
 Sloan Great Wall
 CfA2 Great Wall
 South Pole Wall
 BOSS Great Wall
 Hercules–Corona Borealis Great Wall

References

Galaxy filaments
Physical cosmology
Large-scale structure of the cosmos